Graben is a small settlement in the Municipality of Ribnica in southern Slovenia. The area is part of the traditional region of Lower Carniola and is now included in the Southeast Slovenia Statistical Region.

After the Second World War, a Yugoslav labor camp for political prisoners operated in Graben.

A small roadside chapel-shrine in the southern outskirts of the settlement is dedicated to the Virgin Mary and was built in the second half of the 19th century.

References

External links
Graben on Geopedia

Populated places in the Municipality of Ribnica